Huang Fangfang (born October 1958) is a former Chinese politician who served as director of the Development and Reform Commission of Guangxi Zhuang Autonomous Region between 2011 and 2018. He was investigated by China's top anti-graft agency in November 2022.

He was a delegate to the 9th, 10th and 11th National People's Congress.

Early life and education
Huang was born in Tiandeng County, Guangxi, in October 1958. After resuming the college entrance examination, in 1978, he entered Chengdu College of Geology (now Chengdu University of Technology), where he earned his Master of Science degree in 1989. He went on to receive his Doctor of Science degree in 1992 from China University of Geosciences. He was a student at China University of Political Science and Law from July 1995 to February 1997. He also studied as a part-time student at the Advanced Training Course jointly organized by Tsinghua University and Harvard University in 2005.

Political career
Huang joined the Chinese Communist Party (CCP) in December 1981, and began his political career in July 1992, when he became an official in the Geological Research Institute of Guangxi Zhuang Autonomous Region. In April 1994, he was assigned to the Bureau of Geology and Mineral Resources of Guangxi Zhuang Autonomous Region, and eventually becoming deputy director in November 1997. In May 1998, he was appointed director of the Coal Industry Bureau of Guangxi Zhuang Autonomous Region, but having held the position for only six months.

Huang was deputy party secretary of Wuzhou in December 1998, in addition to serving as mayor. He was assigned to the similar position in Guigang in February 2002.

In April 2003, Huang was appointed director of the Department of Land and Resources of Guangxi Zhuang Autonomous Region, concurrently serving as party branch secretary.

In May 2008, Huang was transferred to Nanning, the capital of Guangxi Zhuang Autonomous Region, and appointed deputy party secretary. In June, he was named acting mayor, confirmed in August.

He was director of the Development and Reform Commission of Guangxi Zhuang Autonomous Region in August 2011 and subsequently party branch secretary in February 2018.

Investigation
On 27 October 2022, Huang has been placed under investigation for "serious violations of laws and regulations" by the Central Commission for Discipline Inspection (CCDI), the party's internal disciplinary body, and the National Supervisory Commission, the highest anti-corruption agency of China.

References

1958 births
Living people
People from Chongzuo
Chengdu University of Technology alumni
China University of Geosciences alumni
China University of Political Science and Law alumni
People's Republic of China politicians from Guangxi
Chinese Communist Party politicians from Guangxi
Delegates to the 9th National People's Congress
Delegates to the 10th National People's Congress
Delegates to the 11th National People's Congress
Mayors of Wuzhou
Mayors of Guigang
Mayors of Nanning